Laurie Colwin (June 14, 1944 – October 24, 1992) was an American writer who wrote five novels, three collections of short stories and two volumes of essays and recipes. She was known for her portrayals of New York society and her food columns in Gourmet magazine.

Life 
Colwin was born in Manhattan, New York City, and grew up in Lake Ronkonkoma, on Long Island, Philadelphia and Chicago, the second child of Estelle Colwin (née Woolfson) and Peter Colwin. In Philadelphia, she attended the Cheltenham High School, which inducted her posthumously into its Hall of Fame in 1999.

From an early age, Colwin was a prolific writer. Her work first appeared in The New Yorker and, in 1974, her first collection of short stories was published. She was a regular contributor to Gourmet magazine and had articles in Mademoiselle, Allure, and Playboy. Her non-fiction books (Home Cooking and More Home Cooking) are collections of essays, and are as much memoirs as cookbooks. In the foreword to Home Cooking, Colwin wrote: "Even at her most solitary, a cook in the kitchen is surrounded by generations of cooks past, the advice and menus of cooks present, the wisdom of cookbook writers. In my kitchen I rely on Edna Lewis, Marcella Hazan, Jane Grigson, Elizabeth David, the numerous contributors to The Charleston Receipts, and Margaret Costa (author of an English book entitled The Four Seasons Cookery Book),"

Colwin died unexpectedly in 1992, in Manhattan, from an aortic aneurysm at the age of 48.

Works 
Her published works include Passion and Affect (1974), Shine on, Bright and Dangerous Object (1975), Happy All the Time (1978), The Lone Pilgrim (1981), Wet (1974), Family Happiness (1982), Another Marvelous Thing (1988), Home Cooking (1988), Goodbye without Leaving (1990), More Home Cooking (1993), and A Big Storm Knocked It Over (1993).  The PBS series American Playhouse adapted Colwin's short story An Old-Fashioned Story as a 90-minute film retitled Ask Me Again, which aired February 8, 1989.

Her last two books, More Home Cooking and A Big Storm Knocked It Over, were published posthumously. She also appears in Nancy Crampton's 2005 book of photography, Writers, which features Crampton's portraits of various literary figures.

Colwin's husband, Juris Jurjevics, was the editor-in-chief of Soho Press for 20 years and wrote a novel, The Trudeau Vector, published in 2003; her child, RF Jurjevics, is a technology professional and writer-illustrator.

References

1944 births
1992 deaths
Writers from Manhattan
20th-century American novelists
American food writers
Writers from Philadelphia
People from Cheltenham, Pennsylvania
People from Lake Ronkonkoma, New York
American women novelists
20th-century American women writers
20th-century American short story writers
Novelists from New York (state)
Novelists from Pennsylvania
James Beard Foundation Award winners
American women non-fiction writers
20th-century American non-fiction writers